Inferiority Complex: Chapter 1 is the debut solo album of American hip hop artist Tha Trademarc, released April 8, 2008 on his own print of Trademarc records.

The Trademarc is well known for collaborating with cousin John Cena on his debut album You Can't See Me as well as on his theme song "Basic Thuganomics" and the track "Untouchables". Although once considered a duo with Cena, Cena does not make an appearance on the album. The album's only collaboration comes from longtime associate Freddie Foxxx a.k.a. Bumpy Knuckles.

Track listing

External links
 

2008 debut albums
Hip hop albums by American artists